

P

Notes

References

Lists of words